Prolixodens is a genus of  very small sea snails, marine gastropod molluscs in the family Cerithiopsidae.

Species
 Prolixodens alba Cecalupo & Perugia, 2017
 Prolixodens amethysta Cecalupo & Perugia, 2013
 Prolixodens apexcostata (Rolán, Espinosa & Fernández-Garcés, 2007)
 Prolixodens ara (Dall & Bartsch, 1911)
 Prolixodens benthica B. A. Marshall, 1978
 Prolixodens captiosa Cecalupo & Perugia, 2012
 Prolixodens crassa B. A. Marshall, 1978
 Prolixodens dannevigi (Hedley, 1911)
 Prolixodens giampii Cecalupo & Perugia, 2021
 Prolixodens infracolor (Laseron, 1951)
 Prolixodens inopinata (Cecalupo & Perugia, 2012)
 Prolixodens leogattellii Cecalupo & Perugia, 2021
 Prolixodens lutea (Cecalupo & Perugia, 2012)
 Prolixodens martinoi Cecalupo & Perugia, 2021
 Prolixodens memorabilis Cecalupo & Perugia, 2012
 Prolixodens montrouzieri Cecalupo & Perugia, 2017
 Prolixodens nicolayae Jay & Drivas, 2002
 Prolixodens obesa Cecalupo & Perugia, 2017
 Prolixodens obscura (Cecalupo & Perugia, 2012)
 Prolixodens oleagina Cecalupo & Perugia, 2017
 Prolixodens proxima Cecalupo & Perugia, 2014
 Prolixodens scudellarii Cecalupo & Perugia, 2013
 Prolixodens sknips Jay & Drivas, 2002
 Prolixodens splendens Cecalupo & Perugia, 2012
 Prolixodens vannozzii Cecalupo & Perugia, 2021
 Prolixodens vianelloi Cecalupo & Perugia, 2013
 Prolixodens whaaporum Cecalupo & Perugia, 2017

References

 Spencer, H.G., Marshall, B.A. & Willan, R.C. (2009). Checklist of New Zealand living Mollusca. Pp 196-219. in: Gordon, D.P. (ed.) New Zealand inventory of biodiversity. Volume one. Kingdom Animalia: Radiata, Lophotrochozoa, Deuterostomia. Canterbury University Press, Christchurch.

External links
 Marshall, B. A. (1978). Cerithiopsidae of New Zealand, and a provisional classification of the family. New Zealand Journal of Zoology. 5(1): 47-120

Cerithiopsidae
Gastropod genera